Coventre is a surname. Notable people with the surname include:

Walter de Coventre (died 1371 or 1372), 14th-century Scottish ecclesiastic
William Coventre (disambiguation), multiple people
John Coventre (disambiguation), multiple people
Thomas Coventre (disambiguation), multiple people